The 2015–16 SV Werder Bremen II season is the 1st season back and 5th overall season in the 3. Liga, having been promoted from the Regionalliga Nord in 2015. It is their 37th overall year in the third tier of German football. The club's home stadium is the Weserstadion Platz 11, located in Bremen, Germany. The stadium has a capacity of 5,500 seats.

Background
In the club's previous season in the Regionalliga Nord, they finished in 1st place, earning themselves a spot in the promotion play-offs. In the play-offs, they faced Borussia Mönchengladbach II from the Regionalliga West. The first leg ended in a 0–0 draw at home. In the second leg, after regular time the score was 0–0 in Mönchengladbach. Werder Bremen II were able to score two goals in the last 11 minutes to win 2–0 on aggregate and secure a spot back in the 3. Liga.

Squad

On loan

Transfers

In

Out

Technical staff

Friendlies

Competitions

Overall

3. Liga

League table

Results summary

Results by round

Matches

References

Werder Bremen II, SV
SV Werder Bremen II seasons